Colin Bertie John Sutton QPM (6 December 1938 – 26 March 2004) was a British police officer.

Sutton was educated at King Edward VI School, Stratford-upon-Avon. In 1957 he joined Warwickshire Constabulary as a Constable. He was promoted Sergeant in 1964, Inspector in 1966, Chief Inspector in 1970, Superintendent in 1972, and Chief Superintendent in 1974. Later that year he transferred to West Midlands Police. In 1977 he was appointed Assistant Chief Constable with Leicestershire Constabulary. He obtained a Bachelor of Laws degree from University College, London in 1970.

In 1983, Sutton moved to the Metropolitan Police as a Deputy Assistant Commissioner. He was appointed Assistant Commissioner "B" (Traffic) in 1984. He was to be the last officer to hold this post, as the Metropolitan Police was reorganised in 1985. He then became Assistant Commissioner Management Support, and in 1987 was appointed Assistant Commissioner Personnel and Training. He was awarded the Queen's Police Medal (QPM) in 1985. In 1988 he became Director of the Police Requirements Support Unit at the Home Office and in 1991 Director of the Police Scientific Development Branch, also at the Home Office. He retired in 1993.

Footnotes

References
Biography, Who Was Who

1938 births
2004 deaths
People from Stratford-upon-Avon
British police chief officers
Assistant Commissioners of Police of the Metropolis
Alumni of University College London
English recipients of the Queen's Police Medal
Metropolitan Police recipients of the Queen's Police Medal
West Midlands Police
People educated at King Edward VI School, Stratford-upon-Avon